Mateus de Carvalho Cardoso Alves (born 23 January 2001) is a Brazilian tennis player.

Alves has a career high ATP singles ranking of 395 achieved on 18 April 2022. He also has a career high ATP doubles ranking of 234 achieved on 8 August 2022.

Alves made his ATP main draw debut at the 2019 Rio Open in the doubles draw partnering Thiago Seyboth Wild.

Challenger and Futures/World Tennis Tour finals

Singles: 5 (3–2)

Doubles: 15 (7–8)

References

External links
 
 

2001 births
Living people
Brazilian male tennis players
People from São José do Rio Preto
Sportspeople from São Paulo (state)
21st-century Brazilian people